Lucas Albert (born 4 July 1998) is a French rugby league footballer who plays as a  or  for Toulouse Olympique in the Betfred Super League and France at international level. 

Albert has previously played for the Catalans Dragons in the Super League, and spent time from Catalans on loan at Saint-Esteve in the Elite One Championship. He has also played for AS Carcassonne in the Elite One Championship.

Background
Albert was born in Carcassonne, France.

Club career

Catalans Dragons
Albert debuted for the Catalans Dragons against the Widnes Vikings in July 2015.

AS Carcassonne
On 17 Nov 2020 it was reported that he had signed for AS Carcassonne in the Elite One Championship

Toulouse Olympique
On 28 April 2021, it was announced that Albert would join Toulouse Olympique in the Championship for the remainder of the 2021 season. Due to an injury sustained playing for Carcassonne, Albert did not join Toulouse until July. He made his debut in the final match of the regular season in the 82-12 victory at Newcastle Thunder. He did not play in either of the two play-off matches that saw Toulouse promoted to Super League.

On 22 October 2021, Toulouse announced that Albert had signed a new two year contract with the Super League club until the end of the 2023 season.

International career
He was selected in France 9s squad for the 2019 Rugby League World Cup 9s.

References

External links
Catalans Dragons profile
Catalans profile
France profile
SL profile

1998 births
Living people
AS Carcassonne players
Catalans Dragons players
France national rugby league team players
French rugby league players
Rugby league halfbacks
Toulouse Olympique players